Jean-Louis Fage (30 September 1883, in Limoges – 1964, in Dijon) was a French marine biologist and arachnologist.

A native of Limoges, he studied biology at the Sorbonne and in the laboratory at Saint-Vaast-la-Hougue. In 1906 he obtained his doctorate with a thesis on the nephridia of polychaetes. For the next fourteen years he served as a naturalist at the Laboratoire de biologie marine in Banyuls-sur-Mer. From 1920 he worked in the zoology department at the Muséum national d'histoire naturelle in Paris, where in 1938 he succeeded Charles Joseph Gravier (1865–1937) as professor and director of the department of zoology (worms and crustaceans).

Fage made contributions in the fields of carcinology (study of crustaceans), arachnology and speleology. In 1945 he was a founding member of the Commission de spéléologie (being part of the Centre national de la recherche scientifique – CNRS). He also performed research of Ellobiopsis (genus of parasitic protozoa). A genus of ammonites named Fagesia is named after him.

Written works 
With Édouard Chevreux (1846–1931) he co-authored the section on "Amphipodes" for the Faune de France (1924). Other writings by Fage include:
 Recherches sur les organes segmentaires des annélides polychétes, 1906
 Les scorpions de Madagascar, 1929
 Cumacés et leptostracés provenant des campagnes scientifiques de S.A.S. le Prince Albert Ier de Monaco, 1929
 Mysidacea : Lophogastrida, I, (1941) and Mysidacea : Lophogastrida, II (1942).
 L'Importance de la vie symbiotique dans la biologie des coraux constructeurs de récifs, 1950
 Oxycephalidae : amphipodes pelagiques, 1960.

See also 
 French Federation of Speleology

References

 B-NEAT, Baltic and North East Atlantic Taxa (biographical information)

French arachnologists
1883 births
1964 deaths
20th-century French zoologists
French carcinologists
People from Limoges
National Museum of Natural History (France) people
Presidents of the Société entomologique de France
University of Paris alumni